Irving Park may refer to several places:

Parks
Irving Nature Park, a park near Saint John, New Brunswick, Canada
Irving Park (Portland, Oregon), a park in northeast Portland, Oregon, U.S.
Washington Irving Memorial Park and Arboretum, a park and arboretum in Bixby, Oklahoma, U.S.

Transit stations
Irving Park (Metra), a railroad station on Metra's Union Pacific/Northwest Line in Chicago's Irving Park neighborhood
Irving Park (CTA Blue Line station), a station on the Chicago Transit Authority's system of rapid transit
Irving Park (CTA Brown Line station), a station on the Chicago Transit Authority's system of rapid transit

Neighborhoods
Irving Park, Chicago, a Community Area in Northwest Chicago
Irving Park Historic District, a neighborhood in Greensboro, North Carolina

Roads
 Irving Park Road, an alternate name for Illinois Route 19 east of Elgin; it passes through Chicago's Irving Park Community Area

People
 R. Irving Parkes (1886–1931), Canadian athlete